Ad Vitam is a 2018 French-language TV series starring Yvan Attal, Garance Marillier and Niels Schneider. The plot is set in a world where a highly effective medical treatment for aging called "Regeneration" has been discovered. A cop, Darius Asram (Yvan Attal), and a rebellious young woman, Christa Novak (Garance Marillier), are investigating the suicides of seven teenagers.

It was released on November 8, 2018, on Arte, and internationally on Netflix on June 21, 2019 but removed in September 2022.

Cast
 Yvan Attal as Darius Asram
 Garance Marillier as Christa 'Nora' Novak
 Niels Schneider as Virgil 'Caron' Berti
 Vassili Schneider as Young Virgil
 Victor Assié as Théo Lesky
 Rod Paradot as Léonard 'Linus' Ader
 Anne Azoulay as Béat
 Adel Bencherif as Elias Azuelo
 Julie Moulier as Leyla Perrik
 Ariane Labed as Odessa
 Philippe Laudenbach as Father Samuel
 Hanna Schygulla
 Anthony Bajon as Ian
 Hugo Fernandes as Noé 'Nahel' Müller
 Cyrielle Martinez as Isild
 Benjamin Gauthier as Erik Novak
 Aurélia Petit as Colonel Han
 Jean-Baptiste Anoumon as Angus Singh
 Elise Mollet as Samian
 Alex Martin as Homme de main Odessa
 Bruno Ricci as Charles Vanghen
 Marie Rémond as Hélèna Novak

Filming location 
Ad Vitam was filmed in Benidorm and also in and around Paris.

References

External links
 
 

2010s French television series
2018 French television series debuts
French science fiction television series
French-language Netflix original programming